The 1985 South Australian Soccer Federation season was the 79th season of soccer in South Australia.

1985 SASF Division One

The 1985 South Australian Division One season was the top level domestic association football competition in South Australia for 1985. It was contested by 12 teams in a 22-round league format, each team playing all of their opponents twice.

League table

1985 Coca Cola Challenge Cup
The 1985 Coca Cola Challenge Cup was a knockout competition, contested by the top four teams from the Division One season.

Bracket

1985 SASF Division Two

The 1985 South Australian Division Two season was the second level domestic association football competition in South Australia for 1985. It was contested by 13 teams in a 26-round league format, each team playing all of their opponents twice.

League table

References

1985 in Australian soccer
Football South Australia seasons